Kullfi Kumarr Bajewala ( Kullfi Kumarr the musician) is an Indian musical drama television series which aired from 19 March 2018 to 7 February 2020 on Star Plus. Produced by Gul Khan, Karishma Jain and Nilanjana Purkayasstha, it was directed by Pradeep Yadav and written by Sahana and Faizal Akhtar. The show starred Aakriti Sharma, Mohit Malik, Anjali Dinesh Anand, Myra Singh, Shruti Sharma and Vishal Aditya Singh and was a remake of the Bengali television series Potol Kumar Gaanwala.

The soundtrack is composed by Sargam Jassu and Nakash Aziz, with lyrics written by Shashank Kunwar, Divyanidhi Sharma, and edited Satya Sharma.

Plot

Budding singer Sikandar Singh Gill falls in love with and secretly marries villager Nimrat Bhatia, who lives in Pathankot. But as forced to choose between Nimrat and his career, Sikandar goes on to latter and leaves her, unaware she is pregnant. He then marries the rich Lovely Chaddha.

8 years later

Lovely has spoiled Amyra, her daughter. Nimrat's daughter Kullfi, unaware Sikandar is her father, aspires to be a singer like him. Nihalo hates but wants to cash in on her talent. Suffering cancer, Nimrat gets hit by Lovely's car and dies. Nihalo plans to sell Kullfi for her talent, but Sattu helps her escape.

Disguised as a boy, Kullfi enters Mumbai and
accidentally reaches Sikandar's home. Lovely keeps her to use her voice to make Amyra singer successfully. She discloses Nimrat bore a daughter but gets Sikandar promise to not look out for her. He decides to teach Amyra and Kullfi music.

His brother, Mahinder finds out that Kullfi is Sikandar's daughter but is forced by their mother Sushila to keep the secret. Enters singer Tevar Singh, Lovely's ex-boyfriend. Amyra turns out to be their daughter through past affair. Sikandar learns Kullfi is a girl. Lovely threatens Mahinder that she will kill herself and Amyra if he reveals the truth about Kullfi's parentage to Sikandar.

Lovely misleads Tevar that Kullfi is their child and Nimrat adopted her. Tevar decides to formally adopt her. Lovely's plan works and Kullfi leaves to live with Tevar. Sikandar infers that Amyra is his step-daughter. Lovely implores him to accept her. Sattu tells Kullfi that Sikandar is her father. Insecure, Lovely poisons Amyra and manipulates everyone into agreeing to send Kullfi to boarding school.

Sikandar realises Kullfi is his daughter. Lovely sends her off to a juvenile remand home. Supervisor Ammaji mistreats Kullfi, who befriends some children. On Amyra's birthday Kulfi and some of her juvenile friends are invited to the party to sing and plan an escape but it fails as Kulfi hears Sikander's voice but is caught by Ammaji and is sent back to the juvenile and they are punished.Gradually, they escape and visit Sikandar, who not accepts Kullfi due to his promise to Amyra. Shocked, she runs away. Ashamed of his doings, Sikandar decides to win back Kullfi, who defeats Amyra in a singing contest, becoming the winner.

Few months later
                       
Sikandar loses his memory in an accident and due to some misunderstandings, Chandan Chor takes his place. Sikandar lives with Dr. Nandini and her daughter Pakhi. Being a divorcée, she tells Pakhi that Sikandar is her father. He regains his memory. The family unites. Sikandar confesses Kullfi is his daughter. Proven guilty for killing Nimrat, Lovely is jailed.

Jimmy causes chaos in Sikandar, Kullfi and Amyra's lives, getting them evicted out their home and Amyra kidnapped.
Lovely returns to help them in saving Amyra. Sikandar learns his health is deteriorating and he will die soon so he tries to make things better for Kullfi and Amyra. Later, they get their home back from Jimmy. Lovely wants to get rid of Kullfi once again. She turns Amyra against Kullfi.

Meanwhile, Kullfi meets Chalu who aids her in exposing Lovely, uniting with Amyra and treating Sikandar. Jimmy tries to kill Sikandar. Realising her mistakes and taking his place, Lovely dies. In the end, Sikandar happily sings with Kullfi and Amyra as they stare up to the stars where Kullfi says their mothers are among stars now.

Cast

Main
Aakriti Sharma as Kullfi Singh Gill: Singer; Nimrat and Sikandar's daughter; Loveleen's step-daughter; Amyra's step-sister (2018–2020)
Mohit Malik as Sikandar Singh Gill: Singer; Sushila's younger son; Mahinder's brother; Nimrat and Lovely's husband; Kulfi's father; Amyra's step-father/Murphy Singh: Kulfi's agent/secretary (2018–2020) 
 Anjali Anand as Loveleen "Lovely" Chaddha: Cutie and Tony's daughter; Sakshi's step-daughter; Saurabh and Kajal's half-sister; Tevar's ex-girlfriend; Sikandar's second wife; Amyra's mother; Kullfi's step-mother (2018–2020) (Dead)
Myra Singh as Amyra Singh: Lovely and Tevar's daughter; Sikandar's step-daughter; Kullfi's step-sister (2018–2020)

Recurring
 Shruti Sharma as Nimrat Kaur Bhatia: Sattu's sister; Sikandar's first wife; Kullfi's mother (2018) (Dead)
Vishal Aditya Singh as Tevar Singh: Singer; Lovely's ex-boyfriend; Amyra's father (2018)
Mehul Buch as Tony Chaddha: Music producer; Cutie and Sakshi's husband; Lovely, Saurabh and Kajal's father; Amyra's grandfather (2018–2020)
Anjali Gupta as Sakshi Rao: Tony's second wife; Lovely's step-mother; Saurabh and Kajal's mother (2018-2020)
Rudra Kaushish as Mahinder Singh Gill: Sushila's son; Sikandar's brother; Gunjan's husband; Kullfi's uncle (2018–2020)
 Pallavi Rao as Nihalo Kaur Singh: Sattu's wife; Kullfi's aunt (2018–2020)
 Vidya Sinha as Sushila Devi: Mahinder and Sikandar's mother; Kullfi's grandmother (2018–2019)
 Sunila Karambelkar as Cutie Arora: Tony's first wife; Lovely's mother; Saurabh and Kajal's step-mother; Amyra's grandmother (2018–2020)
Ishrat Jahan as Gunjan Ahuja: Namrata's cousin; Mahinder's wife; Kullfi's aunt (2018–2020)
Romanch Mehta as Satwant "Sattu" Kumar Bhatia: Nimrat's brother; Nihalo's husband; Kullfi's uncle (2018–2020)
Ashwin Mushran as Roshan Kumar: Music director (2018)
Shafaq Naaz as Niyati Khanna (2018)          
 Kanishka Soni as Redkar (2018)
 Iris Maity as Dr. Nandini Sharma: Pakhi's mother (2019)
 Priyamvada Kant as Namrata Ahuja: Gunjan's cousin; Sikandar's lover (2019)  
 Mrinmai Kolwalkar as Meenakshi "Minty" Attwal: Lovely's friend
 Mallika Nayak as Narmada "Ammaji" Devi: Boarding school head (2019)
 Viraj Kapoor as Rocket: Kullfi's friend (2019)
 Hemant Choudhary as Advocate Adinath "Adi" Irani: Lovely's lawyer (2018–2019)
 Rajeev Bhardwaj as David D'Souza: Susan's husband; Kullfi's kidnapper (2018)
 Sudeepta Singh as Susan D'Souza: David's wife (2018)
 Riney Aryaa as Irina:(upcoming actress)(2019)
 Rajat Sharma as Gaitonde: Videographer 
Mona Vasu as Mia (2019)
Romit Raj as Vikram Ahuja (2019)
Sulakshana Khatri (2019–2020)
 Vindhya Tiwari as Charumina "Chalu" Kaneja (2020)
Deepali Saini as Sikander (Murfy Singh) 's fake wife

Guests
 RJ Pritam Singh as host for Independence day concert (2018)
 Sunidhi Chauhan
 Nakash Aziz
 Sukhwinder Singh
Kumar Sanu (2019)
Udit Narayan as host of the singing show Little Superstar (2019)
Usha Uthup as host of the singing show Little Superstar (2019)

Production

Development

Kullfi Kumarr Bajewala is an adaptation of the Bengali show, Potol Kumar Gaanwala. The production company, 4 Lions Films deals with Shree Venkatesh Films to remake the show in Hindi under the distributor of Star India. Hotstar streaming services distributor is under of Novi Digital Entertainment. The show is directed by Pradeep Yadava and Yashraj Shukla. The show's production staff were able to generate an episode in about three weeks. The director of photography are Sandeep and Yadav Mohseen Swan, who provided cinematography for every episodes. The crew used 5 small, special cameras for Visual Effects and the Multiple-camera setup was installed in 180 degrees. Currently, this show set in Mumbai and Pathankot. Actor Mohit Mallik said about Gul Khan's production, "I have worked with Gul Khan before on Suvreen Guggal. We have wanted to work together for a long time. She is a creative person and just a call away."

In January 2020, a leap in storyline was decided while Mohit Mallik decided to quit. But soon it was cancelled and he did not quit. The report stated, "Star Plus auditioned several girls to play Kullfi and Amyra and also men for Sikandar’s role. However, they couldn’t zero down suitable actors to play the lead roles in the show. As of now, ‘Kulfi Kumar Bajewala’ won't take a leap."

Casting

The show's main characters, Kullfi and Sikandar Singh Gill, were the core of the concept for Kullfi Kumarr Bajewala. These characters are taken from original television series Potol Kumar Gaanwala'''s Poteshwari and Sujon Kumar Malik. Kullfi's child character role is played by Aakriti Sharma. She was selected for her acting talent. Producer Nilanjana Purkayasstha said, "Aakriti is a very enthusiastic and fearless child." Otherside, Amyra character's role was decided to play by Spandan Chaturvedi but due to date issues, she was replaced by Myra Singh. Myra said, "It's my first time on television and I'm really excited to play this role." Actor Mohit Malik said about his role, "I have the signature rockstar look in Kullfi Kumarr Bajewala." Dhhai Kilo Prem's actress, Anjali Anand is playing Lovely Kaur character, who is Amyra's mother. She said, "Character matters the most to me and this character is extremely challenging and fun at the same time."  Aakriti's brother, Hardik Sharma was going to join this show, debut as Kullfi's friend but later it delayed for script.  Barun Sobti, who recently played on Gul Khan's Iss Pyaar Ko Kya Naam Doon 3, decided to play on this show debut as a Rockstar, Sikandar's competitor and Amyra's music teacher role. According to source, "Gul wanted to Barun in a significant role for this show. The makers are in talks to get Barun on board." Barun said, "It is exhausting. I am back in the grind. So we are in that zone where we are putting in everything that we have and hoping that people will like it." Later, due to issues, Barun was replaced by Vishal Aditya Singh, as Tevar Singh. Vishal said, "I am really excited to be a part of the show which is already being loved by the audience." Rajeev Bhardwaj, who had performed on Devon Ke Dev...Mahadev, has done major role for this show. He said, "Doing a cameo is like batting in a T20 match where you have to put in more effort and do more homework." Gul roped Priyamvada Kant for a significant role. Kant statement, "My previous show was historical and I wanted a major shift for my next role."

Music

Sargam Jassu and Nakash Aziz is the music composer of this show. The soundtrack album was produced by Gul Khan and Nilanjana, written by Shashank Kunwar, Shaheen Iqbal and Satya Sharma. This album released several songs, which are featured by Rashi Salil Harmalkar, Bhaven Dhanak and Nakash. Song Dama Dam Mast Qalandar was remade for this show. The remade version also featured by Rashi Salil, which promo was released on 8 March 2018 via YouTube. The promo video has over 10 million views on YouTube. In addition to singing in an effort to explain something to the viewers. "Asha Ka Pathaasha" male version song originally featured by Bhaven Dhanak. Music director Nakash said in a statement, "I am very excited and looking forward to the episode. We have created some lovely tracks and I enjoyed shooting them."

Release
Marketing
On 14 February 2018, the first promo of the show was released, with the title song. On 28 February 2018, the second promo of the show was released which is based on Kullfi, wished Happy Holi. Soon after, the promo began trending on Twitter with the hashtag #Kullfi. On 24 February 2018, child artiste Aakriti Sharma and actress Shruti Sharma welcomed the production team, media and public with colours of Holi, location at Lucknow. On 10 March 2018, a musical concert was organized by Gul Khan at Chandigarh, Punjab. The musical concert was performed by child artiste Aakriti Sharma, Punjabi singer and songwriter, Gurdas Maan, the Nooran Sisters and Rajasthani young maestros, the Langa Kids.

Premiere
The show replaced the prime time slot of Ikyawann, but Panorama Entertainment's production producer Suzana Ghai confirmed that Ikyawann was not going to air off, it replaced the time slot of Meri Durga, which was aired off. On 19 March 2018, the show was first released on the Hotstar streaming service, for the premium viewers of India. Later, this show broadcast on the Star Plus. In countries like Bangladesh, Indonesia, Malaysia, Myanmar, Nepal, Pakistan, Singapore, Sri Lanka and United Kingdom broadcast on the original release date. On 20 March 2018, the show was released in United States.

Owing to its declining trp ratings, it was shifted to the evening time slot 6:30pm from its prime time slot 8:30 pm (IST) and was replaced by Yehh Jadu Hai Jinn Ka! on 14 October 2019 produced by the same production house. On 23 December 2019, it was shifted to 7:00pm (IST) replacing Namah.

Episodes

Reception
Critical reception
The show has received many positive reviews from critics. Bollywood Life's Urmimala Banerjee praised about the show, "Kullfi Kumar Bajewala seems to be a refreshing story centred around a child protagonist. The village set up looks very realistic and makes for a pleasant watch."

Ratings
In its first week, the show was ranked in the top sixteen in India. The show has received a number of Target rating point, 4323 impressions, which means more than 4.3 million viewers watched this show in its first week. This show was ranked in the top one in the United Kingdom. More than 98,000 viewers watched this show in the UK. Kullfi Kumarr Bajewala had taken Yeh Hai Mohabbatein'' position, which was previously the premier Hindi show in the UK. During the third week, this show catapulted to eighth position, with 4.8 million impressions in India. During the sixth week, this show climbed up to sixth place in India. During the ninth week, this show has reached at the top fifth position with 4500 impressions. During thirtieth week, the show received 6731 impressions with fourth position.

In the tables below, the   represent the lowest ratings or ranks and the  represent the highest ratings or ranks.

Awards and nominations

Kullfi Kumarr Bajewala and its cast and crew have been nominated for Gold Awards 2018 and Indian Television Academy Awards. Child actress Aakriti has received her first award for this show as the Best Child Actor. Otherside, Mohit Malik has won the Stellar Performer of the Year award for his exhibiting role.

Notes

References

External links
 
 
 Kullfi Kumarr Bajewala on TV Time

2018 Indian television series debuts
Indian drama television series
StarPlus original programming
Television shows set in Mumbai
Indian musical television series
Television series by 4 Lions Films
Television shows set in Punjab, India
2020 Indian television series endings